Mount Triumph is a summit in the North Cascades range of Washington state. A significant peak in North Cascades National Park, Mount Triumph is one of its "outstanding sights" and is well known among regional climbers for its lack of easy climbing routes to the summit. Despite its moderate elevation, its local relief is dramatic.

The mountain is extremely rugged and one author describes it as "a rock thumb with near-vertical to overhanging faces on three sides." From above, it has the appearance of a three-bladed propeller consisting of the northeast, northwest, and south ridges. The two peaks are connected by Triumph Pass.

Geology

The mountain lies completely within the drainage of the Skagit River, Bacon Creek and Goodell Creek being tributaries of the Skagit. Two small glaciers are found below the east face and north faces, both of which are receding. The south ridge of Mount Triumph ends at a minor peak that has been called Thornton Peak.

Mount Triumph is composed of old orthogneiss. Neighboring Mount Despair is an exposure of light grey granodiorite, part of the great pluton of the Chilliwack batholith, which is visible west of the Thornton Lakes. East of the lakes are dark amphibolite, orthogneiss and mica quartz schist.

Climbing
The easiest route to the summit is on the west. It is rated  and can be dangerous when wet. The approach is by means of the Triumph Pass climber's route. The northeast ridge is more difficult at class 5.5, but is a notable climb on generally good rock. It is approached by means of the Thornton Lakes Trail. A scrambling route from Thornton Lakes Trail leads to the summit of Trappers Peak which provides good views of Mount Triumph.

Climate

Mount Triumph is located in the marine west coast climate zone of western North America. Most weather fronts originate in the Pacific Ocean, and travel northeast toward the Cascade Mountains. As fronts approach the North Cascades, they are forced upward by the peaks of the Cascade Range, causing them to drop their moisture in the form of rain or snowfall onto the Cascades (Orographic lift). As a result, the west side of the North Cascades experiences high precipitation, especially during the winter months in the form of snowfall. During winter months, weather is usually cloudy, but, due to high pressure systems over the Pacific Ocean that intensify during summer months, there is often little or no cloud cover during the summer. Because of maritime influence, snow tends to be wet and heavy, resulting in high avalanche danger.

Nearby mountains

 Mount Blum
 Mount Despair
 Mount Shuksan
 Mount Terror

References

External links

Mountains of Washington (state)
North Cascades of Washington (state)
Mountains of Whatcom County, Washington
North Cascades National Park